The Golden Eagle is an Australian Turf Club thoroughbred horse race run over 1,500 metres on turf at Rosehill Racecourse in Sydney, Australia on the last Saturday in October.

Run for the first time in 2019, with prizemoney of $7.5 million, it is the world's fourth richest race on turf after The Everest, Melbourne Cup and the Prix de l'Arc de Triomphe. It is planned that 10% of $7.5 million prize fund will be donated to charity. Each runner will nominate a charity that has been accredited with Racing NSW.

It is open to four-year-olds at set-weight conditions.

2019 Golden Eagle
The inaugural $7.5m Golden Eagle was won by the Chris Waller trained Kolding underneath in-form hoop Glen Boss.

Kolding, a last-start winner of the Epsom Handicap, he was sent out as an equal second-favourite at $6 and he confirmed his status as an elite galloper with an authoritative win over a gallant Sunlight, with Mizzy narrowly holding on for third over Behemoth.

Race favourite Arcadia Queen ($3.30) had her chance but couldn't match motors with the winner, finishing fifth in the 16-horse field.

Last place went the way of Gem Song ($61) who finished  47L in arrears of the winner.

Winners

References
 

Flat horse races for four-year-olds
Horse races in Australia
Recurring sporting events established in 2019
Sports competitions in Sydney
2019 establishments in Australia